Theodore Ellis or Ted Ellis may refer to:

 Ted Ellis (artist) (born 1963), American artist
 Ted Ellis (footballer) (1913–2007), Australian rules footballer
 Ted Ellis (naturalist) (1909–1986), Norfolk naturalist and journalist
 Theodore T. Ellis (1867–1934), American inventor and publisher.

See also
 Edward Ellis (disambiguation)